Richard Carter (1617–1668) was an English politician who sat in the House of Commons in 1654 and 1656.

Carter was the son of John Carter of Columb, Cornwall. He matriculated at Exeter College, Oxford on 9 September 1634, aged 17. He was of St. Columb, or Columb Major.

In 1654, Carter was elected Member of Parliament for Cornwall in the First Protectorate Parliament. He was re-elected MP for Cornwall in 1656 for the Second Protectorate Parliament. 
 
Carter died at the age of 50 and was buried on 29 January 1668.

References

1617 births
1668 deaths
Members of the pre-1707 English Parliament for constituencies in Cornwall
Alumni of Exeter College, Oxford
Place of birth missing
People from St Columb Major
English MPs 1654–1655
English MPs 1656–1658